SS Saskadoc was a lake freighter, built in Cleveland, Ohio, in 1900. She displaced , and her registered tonnage was 2,876. Her steam engines produced .

She was originally named William E. Reis. She was refloated, repaired, and sold to Interlake Steamship Company, in 1913, which renamed her Uranus.

References

External links
 http://images.ourontario.ca/Partners/MHGL/TMHS000114659pf_0008p.pdf

Steamships of Canada
Great Lakes freighters
1899 ships
Maritime incidents in 1907
Ships built in Cleveland